Fred Wolf is an American film director, screenwriter, television writer, and former stand-up comedian.

Career
Wolf began his career performing stand-up in Los Angeles in the 1980s, and landed his first major television role as co-host (with Paul Provenza) on the Comedy Central variety series Comics Only in the early 1990s. In 1992, Wolf joined the writing staff of Saturday Night Live and also served for several years as head writer up until 1996. In 1996, he joined the SNL cast as a featured player, before leaving the show in October of that same year. Since leaving SNL, he has collaborated with many of his former SNL co-workers, writing and directing films for SNL stars such as Adam Sandler, Chris Farley, Norm Macdonald, David Spade, and Rob Schneider.

Filmography

Film

Television
An asterisk (*) indicates an appearance as an actor.
The Pat Sajak Show (1989–1990)
1993 MTV Movie Awards (1993)
The Chevy Chase Show (1993)
Saturday Night Live* (1992–1996)

References

External links
 

1964 births
21st-century American comedians
American male screenwriters
American stand-up comedians
Comedy film directors
Film directors from New York City
Living people
Screenwriters from New York (state)
21st-century American screenwriters
21st-century American male writers